This is a list of 1285 species in Anomala, a genus of shining leaf chafers in the family Scarabaeidae.

Anomala species

A

 Anomala abraensis Frey, 1976 c g
 Anomala accincta Prokofiev, 2013 c g
 Anomala achrogastra Machatschke, 1969 c g
 Anomala acromialis (Ohaus, 1916) c g
 Anomala acusigera Lin, 2002 c g
 Anomala acutangula Ohaus, 1914 c g
 Anomala adhaerescens Ohaus, 1916 c g
 Anomala adscita (Robinson, 1941) i c g
 Anomala adunca Zorn, 2011 c g
 Anomala adustula (Gerstaecker, 1884) c g
 Anomala aegrota Arrow, 1917 c g
 Anomala aelia Ohaus, 1932 c g
 Anomala aeneiventris Fairmaire, 1883 c g
 Anomala aeneoprasina Prokofiev, 2013 c g
 Anomala aeneotincta Fairmaire, 1883 c g
 Anomala aequalis Zorn, 2007 c g
 Anomala aereiventris Filippini, Micó & Galante, 2015 c g
 Anomala aericollis Burmeister, 1855 c g
 Anomala aeruginosa Boisduval, 1835 c g
 Anomala affinis Ganglbauer, 1882 c g
 Anomala afghana (Balthasar, 1968) c g
 Anomala agilis Arrow, 1917 c g
 Anomala aglaos Filippini, Galante & Micó, 2015 c g
 Anomala ahlwarthi Ohaus, 1916 c g
 Anomala ahrensi Zorn, 2011 c g
 Anomala albaya Arrow, 1915 c g
 Anomala albopilosa (Hope, 1839) c g
 Anomala alinae Zorn, 2011 c g
 Anomala amarginata Zhang & Lin, 2008 c g
 Anomala amoena Frey, 1971 c g
 Anomala amphicoma Bates, 1888 c g
 Anomala amychodes Ohaus, 1914 c g
 Anomala anacantha Ohaus, 1915 c g
 Anomala anchoralis Lansberge, 1879 c g
 Anomala ancilla Gerstaecker, 1867 c g
 Anomala andamanica Arrow, 1917 c g
 Anomala andradei Heller, 1893 c g
 Anomala angolana Ohaus, 1925 c g
 Anomala anguliceps Arrow, 1917 c g
 Anomala angulicollis Arrow, 1917 c g
 Anomala angulipennis Ohaus, 1910 c g
 Anomala angusta Arrow, 1912 c g
 Anomala annamensis Prokofiev, 2014 c g
 Anomala anodonta Ohaus, 1916 c g
 Anomala anoguttata Burmeister, 1844 c g
 Anomala anoxantha Ohaus, 1937 c g
 Anomala antennata Schaeffer, 1906 i c g b
 Anomala anthracina Arrow, 1912 c g
 Anomala anthusa Ohaus, 1937 c g
 Anomala antica Ohaus, 1897 c g
 Anomala antiqua (Gyllenhal, 1817) c g
 Anomala antis Ohaus, 1902 c g
 Anomala apacheana Wickham, 1913 c g
 Anomala aphodioides (Benderitter, 1927) c g
 Anomala apogonioides Ohaus, 1924 c g
 Anomala arara Ohaus, 1897 c g
 Anomala ardoini Frey, 1971 c g
 Anomala arida Casey, 1915 i c g b
 Anomala arrawaka Ohaus, 1902 c g
 Anomala artemida Prokofiev, 2015 c g
 Anomala arthuri Filippini, Galante & Micó, 2014 c g
 Anomala aruensis Zorn, 2007 c g
 Anomala aspera Ohaus, 1914 c g
 Anomala aspersa Filippini, Micó & Galante, 2015 c g
 Anomala assimilis Boisduval, 1835 c g
 Anomala atjehana (Ohaus, 1926) c g
 Anomala atomogramma Bates, 1888 c g
 Anomala atriplicis (Fabricius, 1787) c g
 Anomala atriventris Zorn, 2011 c g
 Anomala atrivillosa Filippini, Micó & Galante, 2015 c g
 Anomala atrocyanea Burmeister, 1844 c g
 Anomala atrovirens Lin, 2000 c g
 Anomala attenuata Bates, 1888 c g
 Anomala aulacoides Ohaus, 1915 c g
 Anomala aulax (Wiedemann, 1823) c g
 Anomala aureoflava Arrow, 1917 c g
 Anomala aureola (Hope, 1839) c g
 Anomala auriculata Ohaus, 1916 c g
 Anomala auripennis Arrow, 1912 c g
 Anomala aurora Arrow, 1912 c g
 Anomala ausonia Erichson, 1848 c g
 Anomala australis Lin, 2002 c g
 Anomala ayjikcala Morón & Nogueira, 2002 c g

B

 Anomala babai Kobayashi, 1987 c g
 Anomala badia Ohaus, 1925 c g
 Anomala baeri Ohaus, 1910 c g
 Anomala bakeri Ohaus, 1914 c g
 Anomala balduina Ohaus, 1925 c g
 Anomala balzapambae Ohaus, 1897 c g
 Anomala bandicola Ohaus, 1916 c g
 Anomala barbarae Frey, 1968 c g
 Anomala barbellata Lin, 1996 c g
 Anomala barbellicauda Lin, 1999 c g
 Anomala barbicollis Bates, 1888 c g
 Anomala basalis (Guérin-Méneville, 1847) c g
 Anomala batesi Ohaus, 1902 c g
 Anomala beckeri Ohaus, 1897 i c g
 Anomala behnei Zorn, 2011 c g
 Anomala belingana Machatschke, 1971 c g
 Anomala bella Arrow, 1917 c g
 Anomala bengalensis (Blanchard, 1851) c g
 Anomala bernhardti Zorn, 1998 c g
 Anomala biakensis Zorn, 2007 c g
 Anomala bicolor (Fabricius, 1775) c g
 Anomala bidolii Ohaus, 1938 c g
 Anomala bidoupensis Prokofiev, 2015 c g
 Anomala bifida Zorn, 2007 c g
 Anomala biformis Arrow, 1910 c g
 Anomala biharensis Arrow, 1917 c g
 Anomala bilobata Arrow, 1912 c g
 Anomala bilunata Fairmaire, 1888 c g
 Anomala bimaculata Blanchard, 1851 c g
 Anomala bimarginata Ohaus, 1915 c g
 Anomala binata Ohaus, 1926 c g
 Anomala binotata (Gyllenhal, 1817) i c g b  (shining leaf chafer)
 Anomala bipunctata Blanchard, 1851 c g
 Anomala bivirgulata Fairmaire, 1893 c g
 Anomala blaisei Ohaus, 1914 c g
 Anomala blanchardi Arrow, 1917 c g
 Anomala bleusei (Chobaut, 1896) c g
 Anomala bogotensis Ohaus, 1897 c g
 Anomala bohemani Fahraeus, 1857 c g
 Anomala boliviana Ohaus, 1897 c g
 Anomala bonguana Ohaus, 1916 c g
 Anomala boromensis Brancsik, 1910 c g
 Anomala bottae Blanchard, 1851 c g
 Anomala bousqueti Le Guillou, 1844 c g
 Anomala bouyeri Limbourg, 2016 c g
 Anomala brachycaula Ohaus, 1915 c g
 Anomala brachypus Bates, 1891 c g
 Anomala brancuccii Sabatinelli, 1991 c g
 Anomala breviceps Sharp, 1881 c g
 Anomala brevidens Ohaus, 1914 c g
 Anomala brevihirta Lin, 1996 c g
 Anomala brevior Fairmaire, 1893 c g
 Anomala breviuscula (Candeze, 1869) c g
 Anomala bruchiana Ohaus, 1911 c g
 Anomala bruchomorpha Arrow, 1912 c g
 Anomala bruggei Zorn, 2007 c g
 Anomala brunnea Klug, 1855 c g
 Anomala brunnipennis (Gyllenhal, 1817) c g
 Anomala bryani Ohaus, 1915 c g
 Anomala bulbicaula Prokofiev, 2013 c g
 Anomala burgeoni Benderitter, 1928 c g
 Anomala butensis Zorn, 2007 c g
 Anomala butleri (Howden, 1955) i c g
 Anomala butuana Ohaus, 1923 c g
 Anomala buxtoni Ohaus, 1940 c g

C

 Anomala caduca Ohaus, 1915 c g
 Anomala caffra Burmeister, 1844 c g
 Anomala calcarata Arrow, 1899 c g
 Anomala calceata Chevrolat, 1865 c g
 Anomala callifera Ohaus, 1938 c g
 Anomala calligrapha Bates, 1888 c g
 Anomala calpurnia Ohaus, 1923 c g
 Anomala calymmophora Ohaus, 1916 c g
 Anomala camancha Wickham, 1913 c g
 Anomala camarinensis Ohaus, 1910 c g
 Anomala canisia Ohaus, 1925 c g
 Anomala cantori (Hope, 1839) c g
 Anomala cantorioides Paulian, 1959 c g
 Anomala capillula Lin, 1996 c g
 Anomala carcina Ohaus, 1916 c g
 Anomala cardinalis Ohaus, 1911 c g
 Anomala carinifrons Bates, 1888 i c g
 Anomala cariniventris Lin, 2002 c g
 Anomala carlsoni Hardy, 1976 i
 Anomala cassiana Ohaus, 1923 c g
 Anomala castanea Fahraeus, 1857 c g
 Anomala castaneoventris (Bates, 1866) c g
 Anomala castaniceps Bates, 1888 i b
 Anomala castelnaui Ohaus, 1910 c g
 Anomala catenatopunctata Ohaus, 1910 c g
 Anomala catochlora Ohaus, 1915 c g
 Anomala catoxantha Burmeister, 1855 c g
 Anomala cavifrons LeConte, 1867 i c g b
 Anomala celebica (Ohaus, 1936) c g
 Anomala centralis LeConte, 1863 i
 Anomala ceramica Ohaus, 1936 c g
 Anomala ceramopyga Ohaus, 1912 c g
 Anomala cerea Arrow, 1906 c g
 Anomala chalcescens Sharp, 1881 c g
 Anomala chalcites Sharp, 1881 c g
 Anomala chalcophysa (Ohaus, 1916) c g
 Anomala chalcoptera (Burmeister, 1844) c g
 Anomala chalybaea Burmeister, 1844 c g
 Anomala chalybeipennis Benderitter, 1921 c g
 Anomala chamaeleon Fairmaire, 1887 c g
 Anomala championi Bates, 1888 c g
 Anomala chanleri Linell, 1896 c g
 Anomala chapini Robinson, 1948 c g
 Anomala chevrolati Bates, 1888 i c g
 Anomala chiriquina Bates, 1888 c g
 Anomala chlorocarpa Arrow, 1917 c g
 Anomala chloroderma Arrow, 1913 c g
 Anomala chloronota Arrow, 1911 c g
 Anomala chlorophylla Arrow, 1917 c g
 Anomala chloroptera Burmeister, 1844 c g
 Anomala chloropus Arrow, 1917 c g
 Anomala chloropyga Burmeister, 1844 c g
 Anomala chlorosoma Arrow, 1917 c g
 Anomala chlorotica (Guérin-Méneville, 1830) c g
 Anomala choui Lin, 1999 c g
 Anomala chromicolor (Burmeister, 1855) c g
 Anomala chrysochlora Arrow, 1917 c g
 Anomala chrysochroma Arrow, 1917 c g
 Anomala cicatricosa (Perty, 1830) c g
 Anomala ciliatipes Arrow, 1917 c g
 Anomala cinaedias Filippini, Micó & Galante, 2016 c g
 Anomala cincta Say, 1835 i
 Anomala cinderella Arrow, 1917 c g
 Anomala cingulata Ohaus, 1911 c g
 Anomala cirroides Ohaus, 1916 c g
 Anomala citrina (Lansberge, 1883) c g
 Anomala cladera Ohaus, 1912 c g
 Anomala clarescens Ohaus, 1936 c g
 Anomala clarivillosa Filippini, Micó & Galante, 2015 c g
 Anomala clathrata Ohaus, 1930 c g
 Anomala clerica Arrow, 1917 c g
 Anomala clodia Ohaus, 1925 c g
 Anomala cludtsi Limbourg, 2005 c g
 Anomala clypeata Arrow, 1899 c g
 Anomala cnethopyga Bates, 1888 c g
 Anomala cobala Ohaus, 1916 c g
 Anomala cochlearia Ohaus, 1932 c g
 Anomala coffea Filippini, Galante & Micó, 2015 c g
 Anomala cognata Zorn, 2011 c g
 Anomala coiffaiti Machatschke, 1971 c g
 Anomala collotra Zhang & Lin, 2008 c g
 Anomala colluta Péringuey, 1902 c g
 Anomala colma Ohaus, 1924 c g
 Anomala colobocaula Ohaus, 1916 c g
 Anomala colonica (Casey, 1915) c g
 Anomala columbica Ohaus, 1902 c g
 Anomala comma Arrow, 1917 c g
 Anomala communis (Burmeister, 1844) c g
 Anomala compacta (Casey, 1915) c g
 Anomala compressicollis Bates, 1888 c g
 Anomala concavifronta Lin, 1999 c g
 Anomala concha Ohaus, 1916 c g
 Anomala concinna Burmeister, 1844 c g
 Anomala conformis Walker, 1859 c g
 Anomala conjuga (Arrow, 1901) c g
 Anomala connectens Arrow, 1917 c g
 Anomala conradti Bates, 1889 c g
 Anomala constanti Limbourg & Zorn, 2010 c g
 Anomala constricta Ohaus, 1915 c g
 Anomala contenta Kolbe, 1897 c g
 Anomala controversa Hope, 1845 c g
 Anomala convexa Benderitter, 1927 c g
 Anomala coolsi Limbourg, 2005 c g
 Anomala corpulenta Motschulsky, 1854 c g
 Anomala corrugata Bates, 1866 c g
 Anomala corruscans (Chevrolat, 1841) c g
 Anomala corvina Arrow, 1917 c g
 Anomala costulata Fairmaire, 1887 c g
 Anomala coxalis Bates, 1891 c g
 Anomala cpustulata Hirayama, 1940 c g
 Anomala crassa Lansberge, 1879 c g
 Anomala crassipyga Benderitter, 1923 c g
 Anomala crassisura (Casey, 1915) c g
 Anomala crassiuscula Machatschke, 1964 c g
 Anomala cribrata Blanchard, 1851 c g
 Anomala cribriceps Bates, 1888 c g
 Anomala crinicollis Ohaus, 1902 i c g
 Anomala crinifrons Ohaus, 1936 c g
 Anomala crucialis (Casey, 1915) c g
 Anomala cruralis Fairmaire, 1887 c g
 Anomala crypsinoa Ohaus, 1916 c g
 Anomala cucusa Ohaus, 1923 c g
 Anomala cuprascens (Wiedemann, 1823) c g
 Anomala cuprea (Hope, 1839) c g
 Anomala cupreovariolosa Filippini, Galante & Micó, 2014 c g
 Anomala cupripes Hope, 1839 c g
 Anomala cupritarsis Benderitter, 1928 c g
 Anomala cupriventris (Ohaus, 1924) c g
 Anomala curata Benderitter, 1928 c g
 Anomala curator Benderitter, 1929 c g
 Anomala curva Benderitter, 1922 c g
 Anomala cyanipennis Lin, 1999 c g
 Anomala cyclops Filippini, Galante & Micó, 2015 c g
 Anomala cypriochalcea Ohaus, 1916 c g
 Anomala cypriogastra Ohaus, 1938 c g
 Anomala czorni Prokofiev, 2015 c g

D

 Anomala daimiana Harold, 1877 c g
 Anomala dairamensis Zorn, 2011 c g
 Anomala dalatensis Frey, 1971 c g
 Anomala dalbergiae Arrow, 1917 c g
 Anomala damara Péringuey, 1902 c g
 Anomala daniorum Zorn, 2011 c g
 Anomala dapitana Ohaus, 1915 c g
 Anomala dasypyga Burmeister, 1844 c g
 Anomala dawnensis Arrow, 1917 c g
 Anomala decolor Bates, 1888 c g
 Anomala decorata Kirsch, 1875 c g
 Anomala delagoa Péringuey, 1902 c g
 Anomala delavayi Fairmaire, 1886 c g
 Anomala deliana Ohaus, 1916 c g
 Anomala delicata Casey, 1915 i c g b
 Anomala delkeskampi Machatschke, 1972 c g
 Anomala deltoides Lin, 1999 c g
 Anomala densa Arrow, 1917 c g
 Anomala densepunctata Frey, 1971 c g
 Anomala denticollis Bates, 1888 c g
 Anomala denticrus (Ohaus, 1910) c g
 Anomala denticulata Zorn, 2007 c g
 Anomala dentifera Lin, 2002 c g
 Anomala deserta Ohaus, 1932 c g
 Anomala desiccata Arrow, 1917 c g
 Anomala despumata Ohaus, 1910 c g
 Anomala detunei Limbourg, 2002 c g
 Anomala devia Brancsik, 1910 c g
 Anomala devota (Rossi, 1790) c g
 Anomala diabla Potts, 1976 i c g
 Anomala dichromiceps Prokofiev, 2012 c g
 Anomala diehli Zorn, 1998 c g
 Anomala digitata Frey, 1976 c g
 Anomala diglossa Ohaus, 1916 c g
 Anomala digressa Casey, 1915 i c g b
 Anomala dilatata Arrow, 1917 c g
 Anomala dimidiata (Hope, 1831) c g
 Anomala diplopsyla Prokofiev, 2015 c g
 Anomala discalis Walker, 1859 c g
 Anomala discoidalis Bates, 1888 i
 Anomala discordabilis Dohrn, 1876 c g
 Anomala discors (Karsch, 1882) c g
 Anomala discrepans Arrow, 1915 c g
 Anomala disparilis Arrow, 1899 c g
 Anomala dissimilis Zorn, 1998 c g
 Anomala distanti Arrow, 1899 c g
 Anomala distinguenda Blanchard, 1851 c g
 Anomala dita Péringuey, 1902 c g
 Anomala diurna Ohaus, 1938 c g
 Anomala diversicolor Ohaus, 1916 c g
 Anomala diversipennis Arrow, 1917 c g
 Anomala divisa Filippini, Galante & Micó, 2015 c g
 Anomala djampeana Ohaus, 1915 c g
 Anomala dohertyi Arrow, 1917 c g
 Anomala dolichophalla Prokofiev, 2015 c g
 Anomala donovani Stephens, 1830 c g
 Anomala dorsalis (Fabricius, 1775) c g
 Anomala dorsata Fahraeus, 1857 c g
 Anomala dorsopicta Arrow, 1912 c g
 Anomala dorsosignata Ohaus, 1916 c g
 Anomala doryphorina Bates, 1888 c g
 Anomala dossidea Ohaus, 1925 c g
 Anomala drusilla Ohaus, 1925 c g
 Anomala dubia (Scopoli, 1763) i c g
 Anomala dudleyi Limbourg, 2003 c g
 Anomala durvillei Zorn, 2007 c g
 Anomala dussumieri Blanchard, 1851 c g

E

 Anomala ebenina Fairmaire, 1886 c g
 Anomala ecbolima Ohaus, 1915 c g
 Anomala echinata Zorn, 2011 c g
 Anomala eckhardti Ohaus, 1897 c g
 Anomala edentula Ohaus, 1925 c g
 Anomala egregia Gahan, 1896 c g
 Anomala eksae Prokofiev & Zorn, 2015 c g
 Anomala elaphoceroides (Escalera, 1914) c g
 Anomala elberti Ohaus, 1911 c g
 Anomala ellipsis Casey, 1915 i c g b
 Anomala elongata Benderitter, 1922 c g
 Anomala emortualis Blanchard, 1851 c g
 Anomala encausta Candeze, 1869 c g
 Anomala enganensis Ohaus, 1916 c g
 Anomala ennia Ohaus, 1925 c g
 Anomala erosa Arrow, 1912 c g
 Anomala errans (Fabricius, 1775) c g
 Anomala ertli Ohaus, 1911 c g
 Anomala erubescens Ohaus, 1925 c g
 Anomala esakii Sawada, 1950 c g
 Anomala esmeralda Prokofiev, 2013 c g
 Anomala estrella Filippini, Galante & Micó, 2015 c g
 Anomala etnaensis Zorn, 2011 c g
 Anomala eucardia Frey, 1976 c g
 Anomala eulissa Bates, 1888 c g
 Anomala eumyops Ohaus, 1925 c g
 Anomala euops Arrow, 1917 c g
 Anomala eusticta Filippini, Micó & Galante, 2015 c g
 Anomala eventifera Zorn, 1998 c g
 Anomala exanthematica Ohaus, 1914 c g
 Anomala exaratior Ohaus, 1924 c g
 Anomala excolens Ohaus, 1916 c g
 Anomala exigua (Schwarz, 1878) i c g
 Anomala exilis Zorn, 2000 c g
 Anomala eximia Potts, 1976 i c g
 Anomala exitialis Péringuey, 1902 c g
 Anomala exoleta Faldermann, 1835 c g
 Anomala exoletoides Lin, 2000 c g
 Anomala expallescens Ohaus, 1941 c g
 Anomala expansa (Bates, 1866) c g
 Anomala expedita Ohaus, 1914 c g
 Anomala exterranea Wickham, 1914 c g

F

 Anomala fallaciosa Arrow, 1917 c g
 Anomala fasciolata Ohaus, 1925 c g
 Anomala fausta Ohaus, 1919 c g
 Anomala felicia Arrow, 1910 c g
 Anomala femoralis (Olivier, 1789) c g
 Anomala fergussonensis Zorn, 2007 c g
 Anomala ferrea Filippini, Galante & Micó, 2014 c g
 Anomala ferruginea Marseul, 1867 c g
 Anomala fibula Ohaus, 1916 c g
 Anomala filigera Ohaus, 1933 c g
 Anomala fissilabris Arrow, 1912 c g
 Anomala fissula Ohaus, 1916 c g
 Anomala flagellata Sharp, 1881 c g
 Anomala flamina Ohaus, 1933 c g
 Anomala flavacoma Filippini, Mico & Galante, 2013 c g
 Anomala flaveola Burmeister, 1844 c g
 Anomala flaviana Ohaus, 1919 c g
 Anomala flavilimbata Lin, 2002 c g
 Anomala flavilla Bates, 1888 i c g b
 Anomala flavipennis Burmeister, 1844 i c g b  (panhandle beach anomala scarab beetle)
 Anomala flavipunctuata Lin, 1999 c g
 Anomala flaviventris Arrow, 1912 c g
 Anomala flavizona Bates, 1888 c g
 Anomala flavofasciata Arrow, 1912 c g
 Anomala flavofemorata Lin, 1989 c g
 Anomala flavoguttata Miyake, 2000 c g
 Anomala flavolineata Zorn, 1998 c g
 Anomala flavonotata Arrow, 1912 c g
 Anomala flavopicta Arrow, 1912 c g
 Anomala flavoscutellata Ohaus, 1910 c g
 Anomala flavovaria Arrow, 1917 c g
 Anomala flohri Ohaus, 1897 i c g
 Anomala florina Ohaus, 1916 c g
 Anomala foliacea Ohaus, 1916 c g
 Anomala foraminosa Bates, 1888 i b
 Anomala forbesi Bates, 1884 c g
 Anomala forcipalis Ohaus, 1910 c g
 Anomala forreri Bates, 1888 c g
 Anomala forstroemi (Billberg, 1820) c g
 Anomala foveiceps Ohaus, 1897 c g
 Anomala fracta (Walker, 1859) c g
 Anomala francottei Sabatinelli, 1997 c g
 Anomala freyi Machatschke, 1972 c g
 Anomala fugax Heer, 1862 c g
 Anomala fukiensis Machatschke, 1955 c g
 Anomala fulgidicollis Blanchard, 1851 c g
 Anomala fulvescens Candeze, 1869 c g
 Anomala fulvia Ohaus, 1919 c g
 Anomala fulvocalceata Ohaus, 1916 c g
 Anomala fulvocostata Ohaus, 1902 c g
 Anomala fulvofusca Ohaus, 1915 c g
 Anomala fulvohirta Arrow, 1915 c g
 Anomala fulvopicea Ohaus, 1928 c g
 Anomala funebris Arrow, 1906 c g
 Anomala furcula Ohaus, 1916 c g
 Anomala fuscaoaerea Ohaus, 1927 c g
 Anomala fuscicauda Lin, 1999 c g
 Anomala fusciceps Fahraeus, 1857 c g
 Anomala fuscoaenea Benderitter, 1921 c g
 Anomala fuscosignata Ohaus, 1905 c g
 Anomala fuscovelata Ohaus, 1938 c g
 Anomala fuscoviridis Hombron & Jacquinot, 1846 c g
 Anomala fuscula Sharp, 1881 c g
 Anomala fusitibia Lin, 1992 c g

G-H

 Anomala gaja Ohaus, 1930 c g
 Anomala gallana Ohaus, 1925 c g
 Anomala ganganensis Machatschke, 1955 c g
 Anomala gemella Say, 1835 c g
 Anomala gemelloprasina Prokofiev, 2015 c g
 Anomala geniculata (Motschulsky, 1866) c g
 Anomala gentilis Machatschke, 1975 c g
 Anomala ghindana Ohaus, 1938 c g
 Anomala glabra Lin, 1981 c g
 Anomala glaseri Chalumeau, 1985 c g
 Anomala globulata Filippini, Micó & Galante, 2015 c g
 Anomala goergeni Limbourg, 2005 c g
 Anomala gordiana Ohaus, 1932 c g
 Anomala gracilenta Reitter, 1903 c g
 Anomala graminea Ohaus, 1905 c g
 Anomala grandis (Hope, 1839) c g
 Anomala granulata Benderitter, 1927 c g
 Anomala granulicauda Lin, 1989 c g
 Anomala granuliformis Lin, 1996 c g
 Anomala grassei Machatschke, 1971 c g
 Anomala graueri Ohaus, 1911 c g
 Anomala gravida Arrow, 1911 c g
 Anomala gressetti Frey, 1970 c g
 Anomala grossepunctata Zorn, 2011 c g
 Anomala gualberta Ohaus, 1925 c g
 Anomala guatemalena Bates, 1888 c g
 Anomala gudzenkoi Jacobson, 1903 c g
 Anomala guessfeldi Kolbe, 1883 c g
 Anomala gypaeetus Prokofiev, 2015 c g
 Anomala haliaeetus Prokofiev, 2013 c g
 Anomala hamigera Ohaus, 1915 c g
 Anomala handschini Ohaus, 1934 c g
 Anomala hardyorum Potts, 1976 i c g b  (Hardy's dune beetle)
 Anomala harpagophysa Prokofiev, 2014 c g
 Anomala hassoni Limbourg, 2007 c g
 Anomala hebescens Ohaus, 1915 c g
 Anomala hebridarum Ohaus, 1916 c g
 Anomala hemiseca Zhang & Lin, 2008 c g
 Anomala hesychastria Ohaus, 1912 c g
 Anomala heterocostata Heller, 1898 c g
 Anomala heteroglypha Ohaus, 1910 c g
 Anomala heterostigma Ohaus, 1915 c g
 Anomala heterotricha Ohaus, 1916 c g
 Anomala hiata Filippini, Micó & Galante, 2015 c g
 Anomala hilaria Ohaus, 1925 c g
 Anomala hirsutoides Lin, 1996 c g
 Anomala hirsutula Nonfried, 1892 c g
 Anomala hirtidorsa Lin, 1999 c g
 Anomala hirtipyga Benderitter, 1924 c g
 Anomala hispidipennis Ohaus, 1897 c g
 Anomala hispidula Bates, 1888 c g
 Anomala histrionella Bates, 1888 i
 Anomala hoegei Ohaus, 1897 c g
 Anomala hoepfneri Bates, 1888 c g
 Anomala holomelaena Bates, 1891 c g
 Anomala hondurae (Nonfried, 1891) c g
 Anomala hopei Kirsch, 1875 c g
 Anomala hoplites Ohaus, 1938 c g
 Anomala hoplocosmeta Ohaus, 1925 c g
 Anomala hoppi Ohaus, 1928 c g
 Anomala hortensia (Ohaus, 1927) c g
 Anomala humeralis Burmeister, 1844 c g
 Anomala hygina Ohaus, 1925 c g
 Anomala hylobia Ohaus, 1897 c g
 Anomala hymenalis Ohaus, 1916 c g
 Anomala hymenoptera Ohaus, 1916 c g

I-J

 Anomala igniceps Arrow, 1917 c g
 Anomala ignicolor Reitter, 1903 c g
 Anomala ignipes Lin, 1996 c g
 Anomala ikuthana Ohaus, 1941 c g
 Anomala illusa Arrow, 1911 c g
 Anomala immatura Boheman, 1860 c g
 Anomala imperfecta Ohaus, 1915 c g
 Anomala imperialae Potts, 1976 i c g
 Anomala imperialis Arrow, 1899 c g
 Anomala impressicollis Zorn, 2011 c g
 Anomala incolumis (Casey, 1915) c g
 Anomala inconcinna Bates, 1866 c g
 Anomala inconsueta Ohaus, 1910 c g
 Anomala indistincta Arrow, 1917 c g
 Anomala inepta Ohaus, 1916 c g
 Anomala inexpecta Zorn, 1998 c g
 Anomala infans (Ohaus, 1910) c g
 Anomala infantilis Arrow, 1911 c g
 Anomala inguinalis Ohaus, 1915 c g
 Anomala innoncens Benderitter, 1928 c g
 Anomala innuba (Fabricius, 1787) i c g b
 Anomala inopinata Ohaus, 1914 c g
 Anomala insipida Lansberge, 1886 c g
 Anomala insitiva Robinson, 1938 i c g b
 Anomala insularis (Castelnau, 1840) c g
 Anomala insulicola Lin, 2000 c g
 Anomala interna Harold, 1878 c g
 Anomala interrupta Lin, 2002 c g
 Anomala intrusa Péringuey, 1902 c g
 Anomala irianensis Zorn, 2007 c g
 Anomala irideorufa Fairmaire, 1893 c g
 Anomala iridicollis Ohaus, 1914 c g
 Anomala ishidai Niijima & Kinoshita, 1927 c g
 Anomala ismeria Ohaus, 1925 c g
 Anomala itohi Miyake, 1987 c g
 Anomala itoi Miyake, 1994 c g
 Anomala iwasei Miyake, 1994 c g
 Anomala jacobsoni (Ohaus, 1914) c g
 Anomala jansoni Ohaus, 1897 c g
 Anomala javana Ohaus, 1915 c g
 Anomala jeanvoinei Benderitter, 1929 c g
 Anomala jocosa Ohaus, 1925 c g
 Anomala jokoana Machatschke, 1972 c g
 Anomala juquilensis Ohaus, 1897 c g

K-L

 Anomala kalliesi Zorn, 1998 c g
 Anomala kaltengensis Zorn, 2007 c g
 Anomala kameruna Ohaus, 1925 c g
 Anomala kanei Potts, 1976 i c g
 Anomala kannegieteri Ohaus, 1924 c g
 Anomala kansana Hayes & Mc.Colloch, 1924 c g
 Anomala kapangana Ohaus, 1936 c g
 Anomala kapiriensis Benderitter, 1921 c g
 Anomala katherine Jin, Weir, Slipinski & Pang, 2014 c g
 Anomala katsurai Miyake, 1996 c g
 Anomala keiana Ohaus, 1915 c g
 Anomala keithi Zorn, 2011 c g
 Anomala keniae Ohaus, 1911 c g
 Anomala keralensis Frey, 1975 c g
 Anomala ketambeana Zorn, 1998 c g
 Anomala kigonserae Ohaus, 1925 c g
 Anomala kinabalensis Ohaus, 1910 c g
 Anomala kindiae Machatschke, 1972 c g
 Anomala kintaroi Miyake, 1996 c g
 Anomala kirgisica Borodin, 1915 c g
 Anomala knapperti Ohaus, 1916 c g
 Anomala kochi Machatschke, 1972 c g
 Anomala kokodae Ohaus, 1936 c g
 Anomala koreana Kim, 1997 c g
 Anomala kristenseni Ohaus, 1912 c g
 Anomala krivani Limbourg, 2005 c g
 Anomala kuatuna (Machatschke, 1955) c g
 Anomala kudatina Ohaus, 1916 c g
 Anomala kuehni Ohaus, 1916 c g
 Anomala kuekenthali Zorn, 2007 c g
 Anomala laccata Zhang & Lin, 2008 c g
 Anomala laesicollis Bates, 1888 c g
 Anomala laeta Arrow, 1917 c g
 Anomala laetabilis Ohaus, 1915 c g
 Anomala laevigata Blanchard, 1851 c g
 Anomala laevisulcata Fairmaire, 1888 c g
 Anomala lamdongica Prokofiev, 2012 c g
 Anomala langbianensis Zorn, 2011 c g
 Anomala laniventris Arrow, 1912 c g
 Anomala laosensis Frey, 1970 c g
 Anomala laotica Frey, 1969 c g
 Anomala lasikina Ohaus, 1914 c g
 Anomala lasiocnemis (Ohaus, 1930) c g
 Anomala latefemorata (Ohaus, 1910) c g
 Anomala latericostulata Lin, 1992 c g
 Anomala lateripila Lin, 2002 c g
 Anomala laticlypea Lin, 1999 c g
 Anomala latifalculata Filippini, Micó & Galante, 2015 c g
 Anomala latipes Arrow, 1912 c g
 Anomala latiuscula Péringuey, 1908 c g
 Anomala lenticula Benderitter, 1928 c g
 Anomala leonfairmairei Zorn, 2004 c g
 Anomala leopardina Filippini, Micó & Galante, 2015 c g
 Anomala leotaudi Blanchard, 1851 c g
 Anomala leprodes Ohaus, 1916 c g
 Anomala leptopoda Lin, 1992 c g
 Anomala levicollis Filippini, Micó & Galante, 2015 c g
 Anomala libidinosa Ohaus, 1916 c g
 Anomala lieftincki Zorn, 2011 c g
 Anomala lignea Arrow, 1917 c g
 Anomala ligulipes Ohaus, 1897 c g
 Anomala limata Candeze, 1869 c g
 Anomala limatipennis Ohaus, 1916 c g
 Anomala limbaticollis Blanchard, 1851 c g
 Anomala limbifera Ohaus, 1915 c g
 Anomala limbipennis Ohaus, 1938 c g
 Anomala limbourgi Zorn, 2011 c g
 Anomala limon Filippini, Micó & Galante, 2016 c g
 Anomala lineata Benderitter, 1922 c g
 Anomala lineatopennis Blanchard, 1851 c g
 Anomala linelli Ohaus, 1916 c g
 Anomala lipodes Ohaus, 1916 c g
 Anomala lissopyga Ohaus, 1924 c g
 Anomala livia Ohaus, 1925 c g
 Anomala loi Kobayashi, 1987 c g
 Anomala longicarcarata Lin, 2002 c g
 Anomala longiceps Arrow, 1917 c g
 Anomala longiclypea Lin, 1999 c g
 Anomala longicornis Lin, 1999 c g
 Anomala longidentata Zorn, 2011 c g
 Anomala longilamina Lin, 1999 c g
 Anomala longipennis (Casey, 1915) c g
 Anomala longisacculata Filippini, Micó & Galante, 2015 c g
 Anomala lucasi Guérin-Méneville, 1847 c g
 Anomala lucens Ballion, 1871 c g
 Anomala luciae Blanchard, 1851 c g
 Anomala lucicola (Fabricius, 1798) i c g b
 Anomala lucida Klug, 1855 c g
 Anomala lucidula (Guérin-Méneville, 1830) c g
 Anomala luctuosa Lansberge, 1879 c g
 Anomala luculenta Erichson, 1848 c g
 Anomala ludgera Ohaus, 1938 c g
 Anomala ludoviciana Schaeffer, 1906 i c g b
 Anomala lujae Ohaus, 1911 c g
 Anomala luminosa Benderitter, 1929 c g
 Anomala luniclypealis Lin, 1979 c g
 Anomala luridicollis Arrow, 1911 c g
 Anomala lutea Klug, 1855 c g
 Anomala luticolor Ohaus, 1925 c g
 Anomala luwukensis Zorn, 2011 c g

M

 Anomala machatschkei Frey, 1972 c g
 Anomala macrophalla Ohaus, 1923 c g
 Anomala macrophthalma Ohaus, 1910 c g
 Anomala macrophylla (Wiedemann, 1823) c g
 Anomala maculicollis Hombron & Jacquinot, 1846 c g
 Anomala maculifemorata Ohaus, 1912 c g
 Anomala maculipyga Benderitter, 1930 c g
 Anomala madangensis Zorn, 2007 c g
 Anomala madrasica Arrow, 1917 c g
 Anomala mahakamensis Zorn, 2007 c g
 Anomala makondae Machatschke, 1972 c g
 Anomala malabariensis Blanchard, 1851 c g
 Anomala malaisei Paulian, 1959 c g
 Anomala malayensis Zorn, 1998 c g
 Anomala malukana Zorn, 2007 c g
 Anomala mancipulla Prokofiev, 2015 c g
 Anomala mandli Machatschke, 1972 c g
 Anomala manguliana Ohaus, 1936 c g
 Anomala manseri Zorn, 2007 c g
 Anomala manuselensis Zorn, 2011 c g
 Anomala marcens (Peyerimhoff, 1939) c g
 Anomala margina Lin, 1999 c g
 Anomala marginata (Fabricius, 1793) i
 Anomala marginipennis Arrow, 1912 c g
 Anomala martini (Hope, 1839) c g
 Anomala masaakii Nomura, 1977 c g
 Anomala mascula Zorn, 2005 c g
 Anomala matangensis Zorn, 2007 c g
 Anomala mathildae Machatschke, 1972 c g
 Anomala matricula Ohaus, 1916 c g
 Anomala matzenaueri Reitter, 1918 c g
 Anomala mausonica Zorn, 2011 c g
 Anomala medellina Ohaus, 1897 c g
 Anomala medorensis (Casey, 1915) c g
 Anomala megalia Bates, 1888 c g
 Anomala megalonyx Ohaus, 1925 c g
 Anomala megalops Bates, 1888 c g
 Anomala megaparamera Filippini, Mico & Galante, 2013 c g
 Anomala meggitti Ohaus, 1935 c g
 Anomala melanogastra Ohaus, 1913 c g
 Anomala melattia Ohaus, 1924 c g
 Anomala melitta Ohaus, 1923 c g
 Anomala menadensis Ohaus, 1924 c g
 Anomala menadocola (Burgeon, 1932) c g
 Anomala mendica Casey, 1915 i c g
 Anomala merkli Zorn, 2007 c g
 Anomala mersa Filippini, Galante & Micó, 2015 c g
 Anomala merula Arrow, 1917 c g
 Anomala mesocnemis Ohaus, 1902 c g
 Anomala mesosticta Filippini, Galante & Micó, 2015 c g
 Anomala metella Ohaus, 1923 c g
 Anomala metonidia Reitter, 1903 c g
 Anomala m-fuscum Filippini, Micó & Galante, 2015 c g
 Anomala micans Burmeister, 1844 c g
 Anomala micanticollis Benderitter, 1928 c g
 Anomala micholitzi Ohaus, 1913 c g
 Anomala microda Zhang & Lin, 2008 c g
 Anomala micronyx Benderitter, 1927 c g
 Anomala millepora Bates, 1888 c g
 Anomala millestriga Bates, 1891 c g
 Anomala millingeni Paulian, 1959 c g
 Anomala mimikensis Zorn, 2011 c g
 Anomala minahassae Ohaus, 1916 c g
 Anomala minangorum Zorn, 1998 c g
 Anomala minima Ohaus, 1897 c g
 Anomala ministrans Ohaus, 1916 c g
 Anomala minuta Burmeister, 1844 c g
 Anomala minutissima Frey, 1975 c g
 Anomala miokoana Ohaus, 1916 c g
 Anomala mirabilis Zorn, 1998 c g
 Anomala mirita Ohaus, 1930 c g
 Anomala misandria Ohaus, 1916 c g
 Anomala mixeana Morón & Nogueira, 2002 c g
 Anomala miyakona Nomura, 1977 c g
 Anomala mizusawai Kobayashi, 1987 c g
 Anomala modesta Benderitter, 1922 c g
 Anomala mollis Arrow, 1917 c g
 Anomala monachula Ohaus, 1916 c g
 Anomala mongolica Faldermann, 1835 c g
 Anomala monochroa Bates, 1891 c g
 Anomala monogramma Zorn, 2011 c g
 Anomala montana Lin, 1996 c g
 Anomala moquina (Casey, 1915) c g
 Anomala morettoi Limbourg, 2010 c g
 Anomala morissaei Blanchard, 1851 c g
 Anomala moroni Filippini, Micó & Galante, 2015 c g
 Anomala motschulskyi Harold, 1877 c g
 Anomala muchei Miksic, 1960 c g
 Anomala multistriata (Motschulsky, 1861) c g
 Anomala munda Benderitter, 1928 c g
 Anomala muricata Ohaus, 1930 c g
 Anomala murphyi Limbourg, 2012 c g
 Anomala mus Arrow, 1911 c g
 Anomala mutabilis Ohaus, 1897 c g
 Anomala mutans (Blanchard, 1851) c g
 Anomala myanmarensis Keith, 2008 c g
 Anomala myriospila Lin, 2002 c g
 Anomala mystica Arrow, 1917 c g

N-O

 Anomala nainitalii Shah, 1983 c g
 Anomala nathani Frey, 1971 c g
 Anomala neglecta Zorn, 1998 c g
 Anomala nepalensis Machatschke, 1966 c g
 Anomala nerissa (Ohaus, 1930) c g
 Anomala nervulata Paulian, 1959 c g
 Anomala niasiana Ohaus, 1916 c g
 Anomala nigrescens (Ohaus, 1914) c g
 Anomala nigripes Nonfried, 1892 c g
 Anomala nigriventris Benderitter, 1921 c g
 Anomala nigrocincta Benderitter, 1928 c g
 Anomala nigroflava Filippini, Galante & Micó, 2014 c g
 Anomala nigrolineata Kobayashi, 1987 c g
 Anomala nigromarginata Ohaus, 1938 c g
 Anomala nigropicta (Casey, 1915) c g
 Anomala nigroscripta Arrow, 1917 c g
 Anomala nigroscutellata Benderitter, 1929 c g
 Anomala nigrosellata Ohaus, 1905 c g
 Anomala nigrosulcata Candeze, 1869 c g
 Anomala nigrosuturata Benderitter, 1924 c g
 Anomala nigrovaria Arrow, 1917 c g
 Anomala nigrovestita Arrow, 1899 c g
 Anomala nigrovirens Reitter, 1894 c g
 Anomala niijimae Ohaus, 1925 c g
 Anomala nikodymi Zorn, 1998 c g
 Anomala nilgirensis Arrow, 1917 c g
 Anomala nimbosa Casey, 1915 i c g b
 Anomala nipsanensis Zorn, 2011 c g
 Anomala nitescens Bates, 1888 c g
 Anomala noctibibo Prokofiev, 2015 c g
 Anomala noctivaga Ohaus, 1910 c g
 Anomala nocturna Ohaus, 1930 c g
 Anomala nomurai Kobayashi, 1995 c g
 Anomala nona Ohaus, 1916 c g
 Anomala novoguineensis Ohaus, 1916 c g
 Anomala nubeculosa Ohaus, 1905 c g
 Anomala nycterina Ohaus, 1936 c g
 Anomala obbiana Ohaus, 1939 c g
 Anomala obesa Candeze, 1869 c g
 Anomala obliquesulcata Lin, 2002 c g
 Anomala obliquipunctata Lin, 1989 c g
 Anomala oblivia Horn, 1884 i c g b  (pine chafer)
 Anomala obovata Ohaus, 1933 c g
 Anomala obscurata Reitter, 1903 c g
 Anomala obscuripes Fairmaire, 1892 c g
 Anomala obscuroaenea Fairmaire, 1887 c g
 Anomala obsoleta Blanchard, 1851 c g
 Anomala obtusicollis Arrow, 1917 c g
 Anomala ochii Miyake, 1987 c g
 Anomala ochrogastra Bates, 1888 c g
 Anomala ochroptera Bates, 1888 c g
 Anomala octiescostata (Burmeister, 1844) c g
 Anomala odila Ohaus, 1925 c g
 Anomala oedematosa Ohaus, 1916 c g
 Anomala oehleri Zorn, 2011 c g
 Anomala ogloblini Medvedev, 1949 c g
 Anomala ohmomoi Miyake, Yamaguchi & Aoki, 2002 c g
 Anomala okapaensis Zorn, 2011 c g
 Anomala olivacea (Gyllenhal, 1817) c g
 Anomala olivea Lin, 2002 c g
 Anomala olivieri Sharp, 1903 c g
 Anomala opacicollis Péringuey, 1902 c g
 Anomala opaconigra Frey, 1972 c g
 Anomala opalina Fairmaire, 1887 c g
 Anomala ophthalmica Zorn, 2007 c g
 Anomala orichalcescens Ohaus, 1916 c g
 Anomala orientalis (Waterhouse, 1875) i (oriental beetle)
 Anomala osakana Sawada, 1942 c g
 Anomala osmanlis Blanchard, 1851 c g
 Anomala ovalis Burmeister, 1844 c g
 Anomala ovampoa Péringuey, 1902 c g
 Anomala ovatula Ohaus, 1910 c g
 Anomala oxiana Semenov, 1891 c g
 Anomala oxylabis Ohaus, 1916 c g

P

 Anomala pacholatkoi Zorn, 2011 c g
 Anomala pagana Burmeister, 1844 c g
 Anomala palaestina Pic, 1905 c g
 Anomala palawana Ohaus, 1910 c g
 Anomala pallens (Semenov & Medvedev, 1949) c g
 Anomala palleola (Gyllenhal, 1817) c g
 Anomala palleopyga (Benderitter, 1923) c g
 Anomala pallida (Fabricius, 1775) c g
 Anomala pallidula (Latreille, 1823) c g
 Anomala palopona Ohaus, 1926 c g
 Anomala panamensis Ohaus, 1902 c g
 Anomala papagoana (Casey, 1915) c g
 Anomala papuensis Zorn, 2007 c g
 Anomala papuna Arrow, 1917 c g
 Anomala parallela Benderitter, 1929 c g
 Anomala paralucidula Zorn, 2011 c g
 Anomala parastasioides Zorn, 2007 c g
 Anomala parca Péringuey, 1902 c g
 Anomala pardalina Ohaus, 1908 c g
 Anomala parotidea (Ohaus, 1910) c g
 Anomala parvaeucoma Filippini, Micó & Galante, 2015 c g
 Anomala parvula Burmeister, 1844 i g
 Anomala peguensis Arrow, 1917 c g
 Anomala pellucida Arrow, 1911 c g
 Anomala penai Frey, 1968 c g
 Anomala pendleburyi Ohaus, 1932 c g
 Anomala peninsularis Schaeffer, 1906 i c g
 Anomala perakensis Ohaus, 1933 c g
 Anomala pernambucana Ohaus, 1902 c g
 Anomala perplexa (Hope, 1839) c g
 Anomala personata Ohaus, 1932 c g
 Anomala perspicax Filippini, Micó & Galante, 2015 c g
 Anomala pertinax Péringuey, 1908 c g
 Anomala phaeogastra Ohaus, 1925 c g
 Anomala phaeoloma Ohaus, 1925 c g
 Anomala phagedaenica Ohaus, 1916 c g
 Anomala phalaena Ohaus, 1915 c g
 Anomala phanthietica Prokofiev, 2015 c g
 Anomala phimotica Ohaus, 1930 c g
 Anomala phlyctenopyga Ohaus, 1915 c g
 Anomala phodopyga Ohaus, 1930 c g
 Anomala phosphora Bates, 1888 c g
 Anomala phthysica Péringuey, 1902 c g
 Anomala phuquocica Prokofiev, 2013 c g
 Anomala phyllis Ohaus, 1925 c g
 Anomala phyllochroma Ohaus, 1916 c g
 Anomala piccolina Filippini, Micó & Galante, 2015 c g
 Anomala pictipes Arrow, 1917 c g
 Anomala picturella Morón & Nogueira, 2002 c g
 Anomala pilicauda Lin, 2002 c g
 Anomala pilifrons Lin, 1979 c g
 Anomala piliscutella Lin, 1981 c g
 Anomala pilosipennis (Ohaus, 1897) c
 Anomala pincelada Filippini, Galante & Micó, 2015 c g
 Anomala pinguis Péringuey, 1896 c g
 Anomala piruensis Zorn, 2011 c g
 Anomala placida (Benderitter, 1927) c g
 Anomala plagiata (Burmeister, 1855) c g
 Anomala planata Candeze, 1869 c g
 Anomala planelytra Paulian, 1959 c g
 Anomala planicauda Lin, 1996 c g
 Anomala planicorna Lin, 1996 c g
 Anomala platypyga Fairmaire, 1893 c g
 Anomala plebeja (Olivier, 1789) c g
 Anomala plectrophora Ohaus, 1916 c g
 Anomala pleuritica Ohaus, 1915 c g
 Anomala plurisulcata Benderitter, 1930 c g
 Anomala polina Ohaus, 1923 c g
 Anomala polita (Blanchard, 1851) c g
 Anomala polyanor Ohaus, 1916 c g
 Anomala polygona Bates, 1888 c g
 Anomala pomona Arrow, 1917 c g
 Anomala ponticula Ohaus, 1915 c g
 Anomala pontualei Sabatinelli, 1997 c g
 Anomala popayana Ohaus, 1897 c g
 Anomala porcia Ohaus, 1930 c g
 Anomala porovatula Ohaus, 1915 c g
 Anomala porrecta Zorn, 2011 c g
 Anomala posterior Harold, 1869 c g
 Anomala potanini (Medvedev, 1949) c g
 Anomala praecellens Bates, 1888 c g
 Anomala praeclara Paulian, 1959 c g
 Anomala praecoxalis Ohaus, 1914 c g
 Anomala praematura Ohaus, 1910 c g
 Anomala praenitens Arrow, 1917 c g
 Anomala praetendinosa Ohaus, 1925 c g
 Anomala prasinicollis Bates, 1891 c g
 Anomala primigenia Heyden & Heyden, 1866 c g
 Anomala prisca Ohaus, 1915 c g
 Anomala probativa Péringuey, 1902 c g
 Anomala procrastinator Arrow, 1917 c g
 Anomala proctolasia Ohaus, 1910 c g
 Anomala profundisulca Lin, 2002 c g
 Anomala projecta Lin, 2002 c g
 Anomala prolixa Arrow, 1910 c g
 Anomala propinqua Arrow, 1912 c g
 Anomala prudentia Ohaus, 1919 c g
 Anomala pseudoclarescens Zorn, 2011 c g
 Anomala pseudoeucoma Filippini, Mico & Galante, 2013 c g
 Anomala ptenomeloides Ohaus, 1916 c g
 Anomala pubescens Blatchley, 1910 c g
 Anomala pubifera Machatschke, 1969 c g
 Anomala pudica Benderitter, 1923 c g
 Anomala pulchripes Lansberge, 1879 c g
 Anomala pumilis Ohaus, 1932 c g
 Anomala pumiloides Zorn, 2007 c g
 Anomala punctatipennis Blanchard, 1851 c g
 Anomala punctatissima Frey, 1970 c g
 Anomala puncticeps (Casey, 1915) c g
 Anomala puncticlypea Lin, 1992 c g
 Anomala punctipennis (Benderitter, 1924) c g
 Anomala punctulicollis Fairmaire, 1893 c g
 Anomala pupillata Burmeister, 1844 c g
 Anomala purpuriventris Lansberge, 1883 c g
 Anomala pygidialis Kirsch, 1876 c g
 Anomala pyricollis Zorn, 2011 c g
 Anomala pyxexcavata Zhang & Lin, 2008 c g
 Anomala pyxofera Zhang & Lin, 2008 c g

Q-R

 Anomala quadricalcarata Ohaus, 1924 c g
 Anomala quadrigemina Arrow, 1910 c g
 Anomala quadripartita Ohaus, 1916 c g
 Anomala quadripunctata (Olivier, 1789) c g
 Anomala quelparta (Okamoto, 1924) c g
 Anomala quiche Ohaus, 1897 c g
 Anomala quirina Ohaus, 1933 c g
 Anomala rabdogastra Ohaus, 1930 c g
 Anomala rantena Ohaus, 1926 c g
 Anomala raphiocaula Ohaus, 1915 c g
 Anomala raui Ohaus, 1914 c g
 Anomala raydoma Saylor, 1948 c g
 Anomala rectodonta Zorn, 2011 c g
 Anomala repensa Péringuey, 1902 c g
 Anomala repressa Ohaus, 1908 c g
 Anomala resplendens Fahraeus, 1857 c g
 Anomala retusicollis Bates, 1888 c g
 Anomala rhizotrogoides Blanchard, 1851 c g
 Anomala rhodomela Arrow, 1917 c g
 Anomala rhodope Bates, 1888 c g
 Anomala rhynchophalla Prokofiev, 2015 c g
 Anomala ribbei Zorn, 2011 c g
 Anomala richteri Ohaus, 1911 c g
 Anomala ricovera Ohaus, 1925 c g
 Anomala rigoberta Ohaus, 1925 c g
 Anomala ritsemae Ohaus, 1916 c g
 Anomala robiginosa Filippini, Galante & Micó, 2015 c g
 Anomala robinsoni Potts, 1974 i c g
 Anomala rojkoffi Limbourg, 2011 c g
 Anomala ronana Ohaus, 1916 c g
 Anomala rosenbergi Zorn, 2011 c
 Anomala rothschildti Ohaus, 1912 c g
 Anomala rotundata Paulian, 1959 c g
 Anomala rotundiceps Sharp, 1881 c g
 Anomala rotundicollis Heller, 1898 c g
 Anomala ruatana Bates, 1888 c g
 Anomala rubida Zorn, 2011 c g
 Anomala rubra (Benderitter, 1923) c g
 Anomala rubricollis Lansberge, 1886 c g
 Anomala rubripes Lin, 1996 c g
 Anomala ruficapilla Burmeister, 1855 c g
 Anomala rufina Ohaus, 1919 c g
 Anomala rufiventris Kollar & Redtenbacher, 1848 c g
 Anomala rufocuprea Motschulsky, 1860 c g
 Anomala rufoides Limbourg, 2012 c g
 Anomala rufopartita Fairmaire, 1889 c g
 Anomala rufozonula Fairmaire, 1887 c g
 Anomala rufula Machatschke, 1973 c g
 Anomala rugiclypea Lin, 1989 c g
 Anomala ruginosa Ohaus, 1925 c g
 Anomala rugipennis (Blanchard, 1851) c
 Anomala rugosa Arrow, 1899 c g
 Anomala rugulicollis Ohaus, 1936 c g
 Anomala rugulipennis Lin, 1999 c g
 Anomala russaticeps Fairmaire, 1888 c g
 Anomala russiventris Fairmaire, 1893 c g

S

 Anomala sabana Ohaus, 1916 c g
 Anomala sabinae Potts, 1976 i c g
 Anomala saetipes Ohaus, 1916 c g
 Anomala sagax (Casey, 1915) c g
 Anomala sagiens Ohaus, 1925 c g
 Anomala saitoi Kobayashi, 1995 c g
 Anomala sakaii Miyake, 1987 c g
 Anomala salticola Ohaus, 1897 c g
 Anomala samarensis Ohaus, 1923 c g
 Anomala sambalanga Ohaus, 1938 c g
 Anomala sampitana Ohaus, 1936 c g
 Anomala sanchezi Ohaus, 1912 c g
 Anomala sandersoni Howden, 1970 c g
 Anomala sangirana Ohaus, 1915 c g
 Anomala saopyga Ohaus, 1915 c g
 Anomala sapa Miyake, 1994 c g
 Anomala sapada Ohaus, 1916 c g
 Anomala sarasinorum Ohaus, 1930 c g
 Anomala sarawakensis Ohaus, 1910 c g
 Anomala sarmiensis Zorn, 2007 c g
 Anomala sassana Ohaus, 1925 c g
 Anomala satulagi Zorn, 2011 c g
 Anomala sauteri Ohaus, 1915 c g
 Anomala sawahana Ohaus, 1926 c g
 Anomala saya Ohaus, 1916 c g
 Anomala scheepmakeri Lansberge, 1879 c g
 Anomala schereri Frey, 1965 c g
 Anomala schoenfeldti Ohaus, 1915 c g
 Anomala schultzeana Ohaus, 1910 c g
 Anomala scintillans Fairmaire, 1893 c g
 Anomala scopas Ohaus, 1925 c g
 Anomala scudderi Wickham, 1914 c g
 Anomala sebakuana Péringuey, 1902 c g
 Anomala sejuncta Bates, 1888 c g
 Anomala semenovi (Medvedev, 1949) c
 Anomala semiaenea Arrow, 1911 c g
 Anomala semicastanea Fairmaire, 1888 c g
 Anomala semicincta Bates, 1888 c g
 Anomala semicingulata Ohaus, 1914 c g
 Anomala semicuprea Ohaus, 1916 c g
 Anomala semilivida LeConte, 1878 i c g
 Anomala semilla Filippini, Galante & Micó, 2014 c g
 Anomala seminigra Lansberge, 1883 c g
 Anomala seminitens Arrow, 1917 c g
 Anomala semiovalis Lin, 2002 c g
 Anomala semipurpurea Burmeister, 1855 c g
 Anomala semitonsa Bates, 1888 c g
 Anomala semiusta Arrow, 1912 c g
 Anomala semivirens (Gyllenhal, 1817) c g
 Anomala semperiana Ohaus, 1910 c g
 Anomala sempronia (Ohaus, 1930) c g
 Anomala senegalensis Blanchard, 1851 c g
 Anomala sentaniensis Zorn, 2011 c g
 Anomala separata Brancsik, 1897 c g
 Anomala sericangula Ohaus, 1925 c g
 Anomala sericipennis Lin, 2002 c g
 Anomala servilis (Casey, 1915) c g
 Anomala seticrus Ohaus, 1912 c g
 Anomala sexmaculata Benderitter, 1921 c g
 Anomala shimenensis Lin, 2000 c g
 Anomala shirakii Nomura, 1959 c g
 Anomala siamensis (Nonfried, 1891) c g
 Anomala sibilensis Zorn, 2011 c g
 Anomala sibuyana Ohaus, 1923 c g
 Anomala siccana Machatschke, 1969 c g
 Anomala sieboldi (Hope, 1839) c g
 Anomala sieversi Heyden, 1887 c g
 Anomala silama Arrow, 1910 c g
 Anomala simalurensis (Ohaus, 1914) c g
 Anomala similis Lansberge, 1882 c g
 Anomala simillima Ohaus, 1897 c g
 Anomala similopyga Miyake, 1987 c g
 Anomala simulans (Casey, 1915) c g
 Anomala singularis Arrow, 1917 c g
 Anomala sinica Arrow, 1915 c g
 Anomala siniopyga Ohaus, 1916 c g
 Anomala smaragdina Eschscholtz, 1822 c g
 Anomala smetsi Limbourg & Zorn, 2010 c g
 Anomala snizeki Zorn, 2007 c g
 Anomala solida Erichson, 1848 c g
 Anomala solisi Filippini, Galante & Micó, 2014 c g
 Anomala somalina Machatschke, 1969 c g
 Anomala sordidula Sharp, 1881 c g
 Anomala soror Arrow, 1910 c g
 Anomala spatuliformis Lin, 2002 c g
 Anomala spiloptera Burmeister, 1855 c g
 Anomala spilopteroides Ohaus, 1914 c g
 Anomala splendida Ménétriès, 1832 c g
 Anomala stalmansi Limbourg, 2007 c g
 Anomala stempelmanni Ohaus, 1914 c g
 Anomala stenodera Arrow, 1917 c g
 Anomala sternitica Ohaus, 1936 c g
 Anomala stictopyga Ohaus, 1915 c g
 Anomala stigmatella (Casey, 1915) c g
 Anomala stigmaticollis Fairmaire, 1891 c g
 Anomala stigmipennis Ohaus, 1916 c g
 Anomala stillaticia Filippini, Micó & Galante, 2015 c g
 Anomala straminea Semenov, 1891 c g
 Anomala strigicollis Ohaus, 1902 c g
 Anomala strigodermoides Filippini, Galante & Micó, 2015 c g
 Anomala studiosa (Benderitter, 1924) c g
 Anomala suavis Potts, 1976 i c g b
 Anomala subaenea (Nonfried, 1893) c g
 Anomala subita Zorn, 2000 c g
 Anomala sublunalis Lin, 2002 c g
 Anomala subpilosa Lin, 1996 c g
 Anomala subridens Filippini, Micó & Galante, 2015 c g
 Anomala subterfulva Ohaus, 1936 c g
 Anomala subterfusca Ohaus, 1916 c g
 Anomala subtomentella Lin, 1996 c g
 Anomala subtrinata Lin, 1996 c g
 Anomala subusta Filippini, Micó & Galante, 2015 c g
 Anomala subvittata Ohaus, 1925 c g
 Anomala sucki Ohaus, 1916 c g
 Anomala sudanensis Machatschke, 1972 c g
 Anomala suklina Ohaus, 1938 c g
 Anomala sulana Zorn, 2007 c g
 Anomala sulcatula Burmeister, 1844 i c g
 Anomala sulcipennis (Faldermann, 1835) c g
 Anomala sulcithorax Ohaus, 1925 c g
 Anomala sulselensis Zorn, 2011 c g
 Anomala superflua Arrow, 1911 c g
 Anomala surigana Ohaus, 1923 c g
 Anomala susca Ohaus, 1924 c g
 Anomala suturalis Lansberge, 1886 c g
 Anomala sylphis Bates, 1888 c g

T

 Anomala taeniana Zhang & Lin, 2008 c g
 Anomala tahunensis Zorn, 2007 c g
 Anomala taiwana Kobayashi, 1987 c g
 Anomala takasagoensis (Sawada, 1941) c g
 Anomala takeshii Sabatinelli, 1997 c g
 Anomala tarowana (Sawada, 1941) c g
 Anomala tawetana Machatschke, 1970 c g
 Anomala techacapana Morón & Nogueira, 2002 c g
 Anomala tendinosa Gerstaecker, 1867 c g
 Anomala tenimberiana Burgeon, 1932 c g
 Anomala tenimbrica Ohaus, 1936 c g
 Anomala tenoriensis Filippini, Micó & Galante, 2015 c g
 Anomala teretina Ohaus, 1932 c g
 Anomala terronoides Morón & Nogueira, 2002 c g
 Anomala tessellatipennis Blanchard, 1851 c g
 Anomala testaceipennis Blanchard, 1851 c g
 Anomala tetanotricha Ohaus, 1916 c g
 Anomala tetracrana Ohaus, 1916 c g
 Anomala thai Miyake, 1994 c g
 Anomala thailandiana Miyake, Yamaguchi & Akiyama, 2002 c g
 Anomala thetis Heyden & Heyden, 1866 c g
 Anomala thoracica (Zoubkov, 1833) c g
 Anomala thoracophora Ohaus, 1916 c g
 Anomala tibialis Schaeffer, 1906 i c g b  (tibial scarab)
 Anomala tigibiensis Zorn, 2011 c g
 Anomala timida Ohaus, 1916 c g
 Anomala tincticeps Arrow, 1917 c g
 Anomala tinctipennis Arrow, 1917 c g
 Anomala tinctiventris Quedenfeldt, 1884 c g
 Anomala tindakua Morón & Nogueira, 2002 c g
 Anomala tolensis Bates, 1888 c g
 Anomala tolerata Péringuey, 1902 c g
 Anomala toliensis Ohaus, 1916 c g
 Anomala tolucana Ohaus, 1902 c g
 Anomala toxopei Zorn, 2007 c g
 Anomala trabeata Fairmaire, 1891 c g
 Anomala transvalensis Arrow, 1899 c g
 Anomala transversa Lin, 1999 c g
 Anomala trapezifera Bates, 1888 c g
 Anomala triancistris Lin, 1999 c g
 Anomala triangularis Schönfeldt, 1890 c g
 Anomala trichia Benderitter, 1922 c g
 Anomala trichonota Ohaus, 1936 c g
 Anomala trichophora Ohaus, 1925 c g
 Anomala trichopyga Ohaus, 1915 c g
 Anomala tricolorea Ohaus, 1915 c g
 Anomala trigonopyga Ohaus, 1912 c g
 Anomala trillesi Paulian, 1959 c g
 Anomala tristigma Reitter, 1903 c g
 Anomala tristis Arrow, 1917 c g
 Anomala trivirgata Fairmaire, 1888 c g
 Anomala trochanterica Arrow, 1917 c g
 Anomala truncata Bates, 1890 c g
 Anomala tryptica Ohaus, 1916 c g
 Anomala tuberculata Filippini, Micó & Galante, 2015 c g
 Anomala tumulata Heyden & Heyden, 1866 c g

U-Z

 Anomala ueleana Benderitter, 1928 c g
 Anomala ukerewia Kolbe, 1913 c g
 Anomala ulcerata Ohaus, 1915 c g
 Anomala umboniformis Ohaus, 1916 c g
 Anomala umbra Casey, 1915 i c g b
 Anomala uncata Zorn, 2005 c g
 Anomala uncinata Ohaus, 1916 c g
 Anomala undulata Melsheimer, 1845 i b
 Anomala unicolor (Olivier, 1789) c g
 Anomala unicornis Zorn, 2011 c g
 Anomala unilineata Filippini, Galante & Micó, 2015 c g
 Anomala usambarica Machatschke, 1974 c
 Anomala usambica Kolbe, 1897 c g
 Anomala ustulata Arrow, 1899 c g
 Anomala ustulatipes Fairmaire, 1887 c g
 Anomala uvirae Benderitter, 1930 c g
 Anomala vaga Benderitter, 1929 c g
 Anomala valida Burmeister, 1844 c g
 Anomala validipes Arrow, 1917 c g
 Anomala vallisneria Filippini, Micó & Galante, 2015 c g
 Anomala varians (Olivier, 1789) c g
 Anomala varicolor (Gyllenhal, 1817) c g
 Anomala variegata Hope, 1831 c g
 Anomala variivestis Arrow, 1917 c g
 Anomala variolata Bates, 1888 c g
 Anomala vatillum Zorn, 2005 c g
 Anomala vayana Ohaus, 1930 c g
 Anomala vellicata Ohaus, 1915 c g
 Anomala velutina Benderitter, 1922 c g
 Anomala ventriosa Ohaus, 1911 c g
 Anomala venusta Benderitter, 1928 c g
 Anomala veraecrucis Bates, 1888 c g
 Anomala vespertilio Ohaus, 1902 c g
 Anomala vestigator Arrow, 1917 c g
 Anomala vethi Ohaus, 1914 c g
 Anomala vetula (Wiedemann, 1821) c g
 Anomala vicenti Franz, 1955 c g
 Anomala vietipennis Ohaus, 1910 c g
 Anomala vietnamica Miyake, 1996 c g
 Anomala vigilax Ohaus, 1924 c g
 Anomala villosella (Blanchard, 1851) c g
 Anomala violaceipennis Blanchard, 1851 c g
 Anomala virens Lin, 1996 c g
 Anomala viridana (Kolbe, 1886) c g
 Anomala viridiaenea Machatschke, 1971 c g
 Anomala viridibrunnea Zorn, 1998 c g
 Anomala viridicostata Nonfried, 1892 c g
 Anomala viridimicans Benderitter, 1929 c g
 Anomala viridis (Fabricius, 1775) c g
 Anomala viridisericea Ohaus, 1905 c g
 Anomala vitalisi Ohaus, 1914 c g
 Anomala vitis (Fabricius, 1775) c g
 Anomala vittata Gebler, 1841 c g
 Anomala vitticollis Lansberge, 1886 c g
 Anomala vittilatera Arrow, 1917 c g
 Anomala vivax Benderitter, 1923 c g
 Anomala vivida Arrow, 1917 c g
 Anomala volanda Ohaus, 1923 c g
 Anomala volsellata Filippini, Galante & Micó, 2014 c g
 Anomala vuilletae Paulian, 1959 c g
 Anomala vulcanicola Ohaus, 1897 c g
 Anomala wahnesi Ohaus, 1926 c g
 Anomala walkeri Arrow, 1899 c g
 Anomala wallacei Zorn, 2011 c g
 Anomala wapiensis Frey, 1971 c g
 Anomala warkapiensis Zorn, 2011 c g
 Anomala waterstraati Ohaus, 1916 c g
 Anomala weberi Ohaus, 1916 c g
 Anomala wellmani Ohaus, 1907 c g
 Anomala werneri Limbourg, 2003 c g
 Anomala weyersi Ohaus, 1916 c g
 Anomala whiteheadi Arrow, 1910 c g
 Anomala windrathi Nonfried, 1891 c g
 Anomala winkleri Ohaus, 1911 c g
 Anomala wituensis Machatschke, 1969 c g
 Anomala xanthochroma Arrow, 1917 c g
 Anomala xantholoma Lin, 1981 c g
 Anomala xanthopleura Arrow, 1913 c g
 Anomala xanthoptera Blanchard, 1851 c g
 Anomala xanthopyga Ohaus, 1915 c g
 Anomala xanthorrhoea Prokofiev, 2013 c g
 Anomala xestopyga Ohaus, 1915 c g
 Anomala yersini Prokofiev, 2013 c g
 Anomala yunnana Fairmaire, 1886 c g
 Anomala zambesicola Péringuey, 1902 c g
 Anomala zapotensis Bates, 1888 c g
 Anomala zavattarii (Gridelli, 1939) c
 Anomala zerekoreensis Machatschke, 1955 c g
 Anomala zornella Prokofiev, 2015 c g
 Anomala zumbadoi Filippini, Galante & Micó, 2014 c g

Data sources: i = ITIS, c = Catalogue of Life, g = GBIF, b = Bugguide.net

References

Anomala